Jackson is a city in and the county seat of Butts County, Georgia, United States. The population was 5,045 in 2010, up from 3,934 at the 2000 census. The community was named after governor James Jackson.

History
Founded in 1826, Jackson began as a  plot purchased for the purpose of starting the town. The plot was divided into squares and each square into lots. The first buyer of a lot in the new town was John D. Swift of Newton County, Georgia. During the Civil War, much of Jackson was razed by the army of General William T. Sherman during his March to the Sea. After the war, Jackson, like much of the South, struggled economically for decades. Jackson remained little more than a small village until the arrival of the railroads in the latter half of the 19th century. On May 5, 1882, the first train arrived in Jackson, heralding a new era in the transportation of people and goods.

During the 20th century, Jackson grew and industrial textile mills became the largest employer of local citizens. The arrival of Interstate 75 just a few miles to the southwest of the city gave citizens quick access to Atlanta and Macon. The numerous schools throughout the county consolidated into one central school system located in Jackson, and the schools desegregated in 1968. In the 1970s, Jackson slowly became a bedroom community. City taxes were also abolished in the 1970s.

Geography

Government
Jackson is governed by an elected city council of five members, each representing a district of the city. The council is presided over by the mayor, who is elected at-large. All officials serve four year terms. The current mayor of Jackson is Carlos Duffey, who was elected in 2022. https://www.jacksonprogress-argus.com/news/carlos-duffey-takes-oath-of-office-as-jacksons-first-black-mayor/article_e49a95d0-6efe-11ec-ac7c-5f677cbb330c.html access-date=November 26, 2022}}</ref> The city government is established by means of the City Charter.

Media
Jackson is the home of WJGA-FM 92.1.

Jackson is a frequent backdrop for a number of television shows. Beginning in 2016, Jackson appeared in Stranger Things, representing the show's setting in the fictional town of Hawkins, Indiana in the early 1980s. Exterior filming locations included the downtown (with some buildings freshly painted for filming), a furniture store (standing in for a cinema exterior), and the Butts County Probate court.

The popularity of the show has attracted many fans to the town. Other shows which have been filmed in the area include The CW's The Originals.

State prison
It is home to Georgia's death row and execution facility. The prison is also home to maximum security general population (non-death row).

Demographics

2020 census

As of the 2020 United States census, there were 5,557 people, 1,799 households, and 1,141 families residing in the city.

2000 census
As of the census of 2000, there were 3,934 people, 1,510 households, and 996 families residing in the city. The racial makeup of the city was 53.71% White, 44.26% African American, 0.20% Native American, 0.43% Asian, 0.03% Pacific Islander, 0.33% from other races, and 1.04% from two or more races. Hispanic or Latino people of any race were 1.27% of the population.

There were 1,510 households, out of which 31.1% had children under the age of 18 living with them, 38.5% were married couples living together, 23.0% had a female householder with no husband present, and 34.0% were non-families. 31.4% of all households were made up of individuals, and 15.3% had someone living alone who was 65 years of age or older. The average household size was 2.54 and the average family size was 3.18.

In the city, the population was spread out, with 26.4% under the age of 18, 8.8% from 18 to 24, 25.7% from 25 to 44, 21.8% from 45 to 64, and 17.3% who were 65 years of age or older. The median age was 37 years. For every 100 females, there were 78.9 males. For every 100 females age 18 and over, there were 74.3 males.

The median income for a household in the city was $28,472, and the median income for a family was $34,773. Males had a median income of $30,331 versus $20,994 for females. The per capita income for the city was $15,702. About 16.8% of families and 21.2% of the population were below the poverty line, including 29.5% of those under age 18 and 29.0% of those age 65 or over.

Education

The Butts County School District, grades pre-school to twelve, consists of three elementary schools, a middle school, and a high school. The district has 184 full-time teachers and over 3,370 students.
Hampton L. Daughtry Elementary School
Jackson Elementary School
Stark Elementary School
Henderson Middle School
Jackson High School

Notable people
 Neiron Ball, former NFL outside linebacker for the Oakland Raiders
 Mac Collins, former U.S. Congressman
 Douglass Watson, actor, best known for his portrayal of Mac Cory on the soap opera Another World
  Casey King, reality television star, best known for his weight loss journey on the TLC series Family by the Ton

References

External links
City of Jackson official website

Cities in Georgia (U.S. state)
Cities in Butts County, Georgia
County seats in Georgia (U.S. state)
Populated places established in 1826
1826 establishments in Georgia (U.S. state)